Four members of the U.S. House of Representatives were elected in special elections in 1973 to the 93rd United States Congress.

List of elections 

Elections are listed by date and district.

|-
! 
| Nick Begich
|  | Democratic
| 1970
|  | Incumbent lost in a plane crash and declared dead.New member elected March 6, 1973.Republican gain.
| nowrap | 

|- 
! 
| Hale Boggs
|  | Democratic
| 1940
|  | Incumbent lost in a plane crash and declared dead pursuant to  January 3, 1973.New member elected March 20, 1973.Democratic hold.
| nowrap | 

|- 
! 
| William Mills
|  | Republican
| 1971 
|  | Incumbent died May 24, 1973.New member elected August 21, 1973.Republican hold.
| nowrap | 

|-
! 
| George W. Collins
|  | Democratic
| 1970 
|  | Incumbent member-elect died December 8, 1972, during the previous congress.New member elected June 5, 1973.Democratic gain.
| nowrap | 

|}

Notes 

 
1973